In international law, a treaty body (or treaty-based body) is an internationally established body of independent experts that monitor how States party to a particular international legal instrument are implementing their obligations under it.

Definitions 
The International Law Commission defines an "expert treaty body" as:"a body consisting of experts serving in their personal capacity, which is established under a treaty and is not an organ of an international organization."A research guide published by the UN library lists key characteristics of human rights treaty-based bodies:

 They "derive their existence from provisions contained in a specific legal instrument",
 They hold more narrow mandates, being often limited to the set of powers codified in the treaty establishing them,
 The audiences that treaty bodies address are limited to countries having ratified the legal instrument (as opposed to UN agencies which enjoy a quasi-universal audience),
 Their decision-making often involves consensus.

Notably, the experts conforming treaty bodies usually serve in their personal capacity (i.e., not representing their country). Treaty bodies are distinct from "international organizations" as such, like United Nations agencies, programs, or other sui generis international organizations.

There are a number of treaty bodies, in particular in relation with international human rights law. However, there are also treaty bodies related to non-human rights instruments such as the UPOV or the INCB. The mandates of treaty bodies is generally defined in the treaty that establishes them, and sometimes by General Assembly decisions or resolutions. Treaty bodies sometimes perform additional functions than the sole monitoring of treaty compliance.

List of treaty bodies

See also 

 International law
 United Nations
 Human rights treaty bodies

References 

Human rights
International relations
International law
Legal doctrines and principles
Philosophy of law
Politics
Society
Theories of law